The 2006 Skate America was the first event of six in the 2006–07 ISU Grand Prix of Figure Skating, a senior-level international invitational competition series. It was held at the Hartford Civic Center in Hartford, Connecticut on October 26–29. Medals were awarded in the disciplines of men's singles, ladies' singles, pair skating, and ice dancing. Skaters earned points toward qualifying for the 2006–07 Grand Prix Final.

Results

Men

Ladies

Pairs

Ice dancing

External links

 
 2006 Skate America website
 2006 Skate America at USFSA, with photos, videos, articles, and a blog.
 Smart Ones - sponsorship info

Skate America, 2006
Skate America
Skate America